Streptomyces deccanensis is an alkaliphilic bacterium species from the genus of Streptomyces which has been isolated from soil in the city Gulbarga in the Karnataka in India.

See also 
 List of Streptomyces species

References

Further reading

External links
Type strain of Streptomyces deccanensis at BacDive -  the Bacterial Diversity Metadatabase

deccanensis
Bacteria described in 2008